James Opie Urmson (4 March 1915 – 29 January 2012), was a philosopher and classicist who spent most of his professional career at Corpus Christi College, Oxford. He was a prolific author and expert on a number of topics including British analytic/linguistic philosophy, George Berkeley, ethics, and Greek philosophy (especially Aristotle).

Life and career

J. O. Urmson was born in Hornsea. He was named after his father, the Rev. James Opie Urmson (1881–1954), a Methodist Minister.  Urmson was educated at Kingswood School, Bath (1928–1934) and Corpus Christi College, Oxford (1934–38).

When World War II broke out, he joined the Army, where he served for 6 years.  He was captured and spent three years in Germany as a prisoner of war, where he spent his time "playing bridge and doing mathematics".  After the war, he was awarded the Military Cross.

After the war he was a Student (i.e. a Fellow) of Christ Church, Oxford from 1945 to 1955. During this period he lived in Monckton Cottage in Headington, Oxford.

In 1955 he accepted an appointment as Professor of Philosophy at Queen's College Dundee, then part of the University of St Andrews in Scotland. In 1959 he returned to Oxford as a Fellow of Corpus Christi College, Oxford and a Tutor in Philosophy. Except for visiting appointments in the United States (e.g. Visiting Associate Professor of philosophy at Princeton University in 1950–51), he remained at Oxford until his retirement, at which point he assumed the position of Henry Waldgrave Stuart Professor of Philosophy, Emeritus, at Stanford University.

Achievements
Urmson and his co-editor G. J. Warnock performed an invaluable service to the development of "analytic" or "linguistic" philosophy by preparing for publication the papers of the Oxford linguistic philosopher J. L. Austin.

After World War II, Urmson's book Philosophical Analysis (1956) – an overview of the development of analytic philosophy at Cambridge and Oxford universities between World War I and World War II – was influential in the post-war spread of analytic philosophy in Anglophone countries.

David Heyd records that "the history of supererogation in non-religious ethical theory" began with Urmson's 'seminal' "Saints and Heroes" (1958). This paper, according to Heyd, "opened the contemporary discussion of supererogation," while hardly mentioning the term, "by challenging the traditional threefold classification of moral action: the obligatory, the permitted (or indifferent) and the prohibited."

Urmson translated or wrote notes for a number of volumes of Aristotle, and commentaries on Aristotle's Physics by Simplicius, for the Ancient Commentators on Aristotle series published in the USA by Cornell University Press, in the UK initially by Duckworth, now by Bloomsbury, under the distinguished general editorship of Richard K.R. Sorabji. His book Aristotle's Ethics was praised by no less than J. L. Ackrill and Julius Moravcsik as an excellent introduction to Aristotle's Ethics.

Although, as Jonathan Rée notes, many of Urmson's writings "focus on theories about the nature of philosophy", Urmson holds that "on the whole the best philosophy is little affected by theory; the philosopher sees what needs doing and does it."

Works
Edited volumes
J. L. Austin How to do Things with Words
J. L. Austin Philosophical Papers (joint editor with G. J. Warnock)
Concise Encyclopedia of Western Philosophy and Philosophers with Jonathan Ree (first edition 1960, second edition 1989, third edition 2004)
The British Empiricists: Locke, Berkeley, Hume (with John Dunn and A. J. Ayer)

Translations
Aristotle The Nicomachean Ethics (translated David O. Ross, 1925; revised J. O. Urmson and J. L. Ackrill, 1980) Oxford University Press
Simplicius: Corollaries on Place and Time Cornell University Press (June 1992) translated by J.O. Urmson
On Aristotle's "Physics 3 by Simplicius, translated by J.O. Urmson & Peter Lautner, 2002, .

Books
Philosophical Analysis: Its Development between the Two World Wars, Oxford University Press, 1956
The Emotive Theory of Ethics (1968)
The Greek Philosophical Vocabulary, Duckworth (1990)  
Berkeley Oxford University Press, 1982
Aristotle's Ethics (1988) Blackwell Publishers

Articles
"On Grading", Mind (April 1950), 59(234):145–169, reprinted in Logic and Language (Second Series) (ed. Antony Flew, Basil Blackwell, Oxford, 1953)
"Parenthetical Verbs" Mind (October 1952), 61(244):480–496.
"The interpretation of the Moral Philosophy of J. S. Mill", The Philosophical Quarterly, Vol. 3 (1953 pp. 33–39.  Reprinted in Theories of Ethics (ed. Philippa Foot) Oxford University Press, 1967
"Saints and Heroes", in Essays in Moral Philosophy, A. Melden (ed.), Seattle: University of Washington Press, 1958
"Austin, John Langshaw" in J.O. Urmson, ed., The Concise Encyclopedia of Western Philosophy and Philosophers, p. 54. New York: Hawthorn Books, 1960.
"J. L. Austin" Journal of Philosophy 1965, reprinted in The Linguistic Turn ed. Richard Rorty 1967
"The History of Analysis" in The Linguistic Turn ed. Richard Rorty 1967
"Literature", in George Dickie and R. J. Sclafani, Aesthetics: A Critical Anthology, New York: St. Martin's Press, 1977.
"Aristotle on Excellence of Character", New Blackfriars Volume 71 Issue 834 Page 33–37, January 1990
Related Works
Human Agency: Language, Duty, and Value. Philosophical Essays in Honor of J. O. Urmson ed. Jonathan Dancy, J. M. E. Moravcsik, C. C. W. Taylor, Stanford University Press, 1988, . Contains a bibliography of Urmson's philosophical works

See also
 Quantifier variance

References

External links

Professor James Urmson Telegraph obituary, 4 April 2012
Professor J. O. Urmson Times obituary, 16 March 2012
"Urmson, James Opie (1915–2012), philosopher". Oxford Dictionary of National Biography entry archived by Wayback Machine.
‘Memorial resolution: James Opie Urmson’, Stanford Historical Society 28 April 2015  archived by Wayback Machine.
The Pelican Record [Corpus Christi College, Oxford], 48 (Dec 2012), 45–51, "J.O. Urmson 1915–2012" by C. C. W. Taylor, "Appreciation" by William Waldegrave.

1915 births
2012 deaths
British philosophers